Evan Roberts may refer to:

Evan Roberts (botanist) (1909–1991), botanist, conservationist and mountain man
Evan Roberts (minister) (1878–1951), figure in the 1904–1905 Welsh Revival
Evan Roberts (sportscaster) (born 1983), American sports radio personality
Evan Roberts (rugby union) (1861–1927), Wales rugby player